Thomas Nisbet (March 31, 1916 – April 7, 1963) was an American professional basketball player. He played in the National Basketball League for the Hammond Ciesar All-Americans and Oshkosh All-Stars. While playing for Oshkosh he won two league championships, in 1940–41 and 1941–42. For his NBL career, Nisbet averaged 3.1 points per game.

References 

1916 births
1963 deaths
American men's basketball players
Basketball coaches from Illinois
Basketball players from Illinois
Guards (basketball)
Hammond Ciesar All-Americans players
High school basketball coaches in the United States
Illinois Fighting Illini men's basketball players
Oshkosh All-Stars players
British emigrants to the United States
Scottish men's basketball players
Sportspeople from East Ayrshire